The Westminster Historic District comprises the historic center of Westminster, Maryland. The district includes about 1400 structures, with a high proportion of contributing structures. The town exhibits a variety of building styles and notable examples of Greek Revival, Georgian, and Gothic Revival style architecture. Most of the structures exhibit early 19th-century residential vernacular architecture and mid-19th century commercial architecture.

It was listed on the National Register of Historic Places in 1980. The Westminster Historic District Commission administers the provisions of the Historic District Zone, a voluntary zoning designation that offers protections to historically valuable structures in the City of Westminster. The commission also reviews applications for tax credits and sponsors various events to raise awareness of the value that historic resources add to our community. 

The Building of Westminster in Maryland, by Christopher Weeks, funded in part through a Special Grant Fund sponsored by Preservation Maryland and the Maryland Historical Trust provides an excellent socio-architectural account of Westminster's first 250 years, including an illustrated inventory of over 200 historic structures.

References

External links
, including photo in 2006, at Maryland Historical Trust
Boundary Map of Westminster Historic District, Carroll County, at Maryland Historical Trust
Westminster Historic District Commission
The Building of Westminster in Maryland, a socio-architectural account of Westminster's first 250 years.

Historic districts on the National Register of Historic Places in Maryland
Georgian architecture in Maryland
Gothic Revival architecture in Maryland
Greek Revival architecture in Maryland
Historic districts in Carroll County, Maryland
Westminster, Maryland
National Register of Historic Places in Carroll County, Maryland